Kevin S. McGrew is an American psychologist and intelligence researcher. He is the founder and director of the Institute for Applied Psychometrics, as well as a visiting professor of educational psychology at the University of Minnesota. He was formerly Professor of Applied Psychology at St. Cloud State University. He is a co-author of Batteries III and IV of the Woodcock–Johnson Tests of Cognitive Abilities. In 2016, he received the University of Minnesota College of Education and Human Development's Distinguished Alumni Award.

References

External links

Living people
Intelligence researchers
Minnesota State University Moorhead alumni
University of Minnesota College of Education and Human Development alumni
St. Cloud State University faculty
Psychometricians
Educational psychologists
Year of birth missing (living people)
American educational psychologists